Janaki Mandir is a Hindu temple in Janakpur, Nepal, dedicated to the Hindu goddess Sita. It is an example of mixed  Hindu Nepali architecture
Fully built in bright white and constructed in an area of 1,480 square metres (15,930 sq. feet) in a mixed style of and Hindu Kingdomship of ancient Nepal. It is a three-storied structure made entirely of stone and marble. 

All its 60 rooms are decorated with the flag of Nepal, colored glass, engravings, and paintings, with beautiful lattice windows and turrets. According to legends and epics, King Janak ruled Videha Kingdom from this part of Janakpur during the Ramayana period. His daughter Janaki (Sita), during her swyambar, had chosen Lord Rama as her husband, and become the queen of Ayodhya. Their marriage ceremony had occurred in the nearby temple which is also called vivaha mandap that later reconstructed by Amar Singh Thapa. The site was designated as a UNESCO tentative site in 2008.

History
The mandir is also popularly known as the Nau Lakha Mandir (meaning "nine lakhs"). The cost for the construction of the temple was about the same amount of gold coins: nine lakhs or nine hundred thousand gold coins, hence the name. Queen Vrisha Bhanu of Tikamgarh, India built the temple in 1910 AD.

In 1657, a golden statue of the Goddess Sita was found at the very spot, and Sita is said to have lived there. The legend said it that it was built on the holy site where Sannyasi Shurkishordas had found the images of Goddess Sita. In fact, Shurkishordas was the founder of modern Janakpur and the great saint and poet who preached about the Sita Upasana (also called Sita Upanishad) philosophy. Legend has claimed it that King Janak (Seeradhwaj) performed the worship of Shiva-Dhanus on this site.

, the temple is reported to have partly collapsed from the earthquake in April 2015.

Pilgrimage
Every year, thousands of pilgrims from Nepal, India, Sri Lanka, and other countries visit Ram Janaki Temple to worship Lord Ram and Sita. Many worshippers visit the temple during the festivals of Ram Nawami, Vivaha Panchami, Dashain and Tihar.

Gallery

Near By Temples
  Lakshman Mandir
  Ram Janaki Biwaha Mandap
  Raj Devi Mandir
  Ram Mandir

See also
Sita Mai Temple
Mata Kaushalya Temple
List of Hindu temples in Nepal

References

External links
 Sita Upanishad
 Janaki Mandir on Google Maps
Janki Mandir  official Website

Hindu temples in Janakpur
Sita temples
1910 establishments in Nepal